Evaristo Ferreira da Veiga e Barros (October 8, 1799 – May 12, 1837) was a Brazilian poet, journalist, politician and bookseller. Veiga founded one of the first Brazilian newspapers, A Aurora Fluminense, in 1827, during the reign of Emperor Pedro I. He was also deputy and senator for Minas Gerais. Veiga composed poems including the lyrics for the Hino da Independência and is the patron of the tenth seat of the Brazilian Academy of Letters.

References 

1837 deaths
1799 births
Brazilian journalists
Brazilian politicians
Writers from Rio de Janeiro (city)
Patrons of the Brazilian Academy of Letters